Haram (also Romanized as Ḩaram-ye ‘Olyā va Ḩaram-ye Soflá; also known as Ḩaram Qeshlāq) is a village in Yaft Rural District, Moradlu District, Meshgin Shahr County, Ardabil Province, Iran. At the 2006 census, its population was 29, in 7 families.

References 

Towns and villages in Meshgin Shahr County